The North  Staffordshire Field Club was an organisation founded in 1865 to study the natural history, geology, industrial history, folklore and local history of North Staffordshire, England. Its establishing president from 1865-70 was industrialist and banker James Bateman FRS.

Publications

The organisation produced its first printed book, Annual addresses, papers, etc. Author, North Staffordshire Field Club, in 1875, having previously published a short Annual Report for members. A history of the early years was published by R. Simms in 1886 as Coming of age of the North Staffordshire Naturalists' Field Club and Archaeological Society, 1865-1885: chronological history and bibliography of the Society. A further extensive history, including that of the various specialist sections, can be found in the Club's special 1916 Jubilee year publication. The annual Transactions were then titled North Staffordshire Field Club, Transactions and Annual Report (to 1960); this later became the North Staffordshire Journal of Field Studies (1961 to 1985) when the title ceased.  A further New Series of separate Transactions with section reports was produced in booklet form from 1970-2000.

A detailed scientific survey of The Birds of Staffordshire was issued as appendices 1-9 to the Transactions and Annual report of the North Staffordshire Field Club (Vol. 64 in 1930, to Vol. 72 in 1938).

The records and publications of the Club are held at the Staffordshire Record Office and other libraries. An index to the 1961 to 1985 run of the Journal of Field Studies was published in the first issue of Staffordshire Studies journal.

The Club's Journal was extant until at least 2000.

At 2020, the archive website The North Staffordshire Field Club (1865—2003) and its legacy offers a partial bibliographic record for the Club.

References 

Organisations based in Staffordshire
1865 establishments in England
History of Staffordshire